Persoonia myrtilloides, commonly known as myrtle geebung, is a plant in the family Proteaceae and is endemic to New South Wales.

Description
Flowering occurs from December to April and the fruit is a green drupe tinged with purple.

Taxonomy
Persoonia myrtilloides was first formally described in 1827 by Josef August Schultes and his son Julius Hermann Schultes from an unpublished description by Franz Sieber, and the description was published in Mantissa in volumen tertium.

Two subspecies of P. myrtilloides, subsp. myrtilloides and subsp. cunninghamii are accepted by the Australian Plant Census. In 1972, Noel Beadle, Obed Evans and Roger Carolin described subspecies myrtilloides in the book Flora of the Sydney Region, but at that stage no other subspecies had been described. 

In 1830, Robert Brown described Persoonia cunninghamii in the supplement to his Prodromus from specimens collected in 1823 near Port Jackson by "D. Cunningham", then in 1991, Lawrie Johnson and Peter Weston reduced the species to Persoonia myrtilloides subspecies cunninghamii in the journal Telopea.

Persoonia myrtilloides subsp. cunninghamii (R.Br.)

Hybrids with P. acerosa,  P. levis and  P. recedens have been reported where the parent species occur together.

Distribution and habitat
Myrtle geebung occurs in the Blue Mountains from Wentworth Falls northwards to Capertee. Subspecies cunninghamii is found in the Wollemi National Park and the catchment of the Cudgegong River.

Both subspecies are understory plants in open forests on sandstone-based soils. Subspecies myrtilloides is associated with trees such as Sydney peppermint (Eucalyptus piperita), narrow-leaved peppermint (E. radiata) and silvertop ash (E. sieberi), and in a shrubby understory of old man banksia (Banksia serrata), Phyllota squarrosa, paperbark teatree (Leptospermum trinervium) and mountain devil (Lambertia formosa). It is also found in heath. Subspecies cunninghamii is associated with the trees scribbly gum species Eucalyptus rossii and E. sclerophylla, rough-barked apple (Angophora floribunda), Callitris species, and mallees such as Eucalyptus multicaulis and narrow-leaved mountain mallee (E. apiculata).

Currawongs and possibly kangaroos and possums are thought to eat the fruit, the seeds of which are then scattered in droppings. Insects recorded foraging at flowers of subspecies myrtilloides include members of the genera Exoneura,  Hylaeus and Odyneurus, Homalictus holochorus, colletid bees of the genus Leioproctus subgenus Cladocerapis, including Leioproctus carinatifrons, L. raymenti, L. speculiferus and Trigona carbonaria.

References

myrtilloides
Flora of New South Wales
Plants described in 1827
Taxa named by Josef August Schultes
Taxa named by Julius Hermann Schultes